Jay Om Prakash (24 January 1926 – 7 August 2019) was an Indian film producer and director. He directed films like  Aap Ki Kasam (1974), Aakraman, Aashiq Hoon Baharon Ka, Aakhir Kyon? (1985)  with Rajesh Khanna  as the lead hero and his other successful directorial ventures included Apnapan (1977), Aasha (1980), Apna Bana Lo (1982), Arpan (1983), and Aadmi Khilona Hai (1993) with Jeetendra as the lead hero. He was presenter for the films Raja Rani and Aan Milo Sajna, both having Rajesh Khanna as the lead hero.

His daughter, Pinky, is married to director-producer Rakesh Roshan, making him the maternal grandfather of actor Hrithik Roshan.

Early life
He was born in 1926. His father worked as a school teacher in Lahore. He used to play the harmonium in the stage plays of his school and college. According to Om, Qateel Shifai and Faiz Ahmed Faiz were his friends. Om would read their books in Urdu and attend their mushairas. He started loving Urdu in those days which improved his sense of lyrics and music. Later in his career he often gave suggestions to his music directors.

Om worked as a clerk in a film distributors office in Lahore and later became a manager. After the Partition of India, he moved to Mumbai.

Career
His film production Company was named as Filmyug meaning  'The Age Of Films'. Aas Ka Panchhi released in 1960 was a Silver Jubilee hit and the company continued to produce films till the middle of 1990's. He was known in the film industry as Om-ji. He produced box office hit films like Aas Ka Panchhi (1961), Ayee Milan Ki Bela (1964), Aaye Din Bahar Ke (1966), Aya Sawan Jhoom Ke (1969), Aankhon Aankhon Mein and Aakhir Kyun.

J. Om Prakash, signed Laxmikant-Pyarelal for “Aaye Din Bahar Ke”, starring Dharmendra - Asha Parekh, 1966. Musical Hit film “Aaye Din Bahar Ke” became the first film of Laxmikant-Pyarelal, with big ‘stars’.
 
The long lasting association of J Om Prakash with Laxmikant-Pyarelal started in 1966 through the musical hit “Aaye Din Bahar Ke” and lasted, 22 years, till “Agnee” 1988.  

J Om Prakash has made a total of 23 films of which 12 films have the music by Laxmikant-Pyarelal and Lyricist Anand Bakshi.  Most of the films involving the Triumvirate, are musical hits. 

Selected Hits of J Om Prakash Laxmikant-Pyarelal.
Suno Sajna Papihe Ne Aaye Din Bahar Ke, 1966 Dharmendra - Asha Parekh.
Sathiya Nahi Jana   Aaya Sawan Jhoom Ke, 1969 Dharmendra - Asha Parekh.
Achha To Hum Chalte Hai Aan Milo Sajna, 1971  Rajesh Khanna - Asha Parekh.
Yeh Mousam Aaya Hai  Aakraman, 1975  Rakesh Roshan - Rekha.
Aadmi Musafir Hai Apnapan 1977. 
Sheesha Ho Ya Dil Ho Aasha 1979  Jeetendra - Reena Roy.
Likhane Wale Ne Likh Dale Arpan 1983 Jeetendra - Parveen Babi.

He made his directorial debut with hit film Aap Ki Kasam starring Rajesh Khanna and Mumtaz. The film was a box office success, and is remembered for the performance by its lead actors and all of its songs like "Jai, Jai Shiv Shankar", "Karwaten Badalte Rahen", "Pass Nahi Aana", "Zindagi Ke Safar".

Most of his films' titles start with the letter "A" or "Aa". According to Om, his first movie Aas Ka Panchhi started with Aa, after this he started "Aa" as a brand name for his naming his movies. There were only two exceptions to it, namely Bhagwan Dada directed and Raja Rani produced by him.

He directed successful Punjabi language film Aasra Pyaar Da (1983) and produced critically acclaimed but box office flop Aandhi (1975). Afsana Dilwalon Ka (2001) with actor Rahul Roy was his last film as a director.

He had served as the President of IMPPA and the Film Producers’ Guild for six years. He was elected President of the Film Federation of India and served for the year 1995–1996. He participated in the Directorate of Film Festivals and Central Board of Film Certification. He had also been a lecturer at the Pune Film Institute.

He had won the Lifetime Achievement Award in 2004 by the Asian Guild Of London.

He died in Mumbai on 7 August 2019, at the age of 93.

Filmography

References

External links
 
 
 

1927 births
2019 deaths
20th-century Indian film directors
Hindi-language film directors
Hindi film producers
Film directors from Lahore